Sisters of Fate may refer to:

 Sisters of Fate (God of War), video-game characters based on Greek mythology
 The Merry Sisters of Fate, a Lúnasa album
 Fates, mythological beings often depicted as sisters